Dolichoderus explicans is an extinct species of Oligocene ant in the genus Dolichoderus. Described by Förster, 1891, a fossilised queen was discovered in Germany.

References

†
Oligocene insects
Prehistoric insects of Europe
Fossil taxa described in 1891
Fossil ant taxa